Lawrence Edward Foote Jr. (born June 12, 1980) is an American football coach 
and former linebacker who is the co-defensive coordinator for the Tampa Bay Buccaneers of the National Football League (NFL). Foote previously served as the linebackers coach for the Arizona Cardinals from 2015 to 2018. He played college football at Michigan and was drafted by the Pittsburgh Steelers in the fourth round of the 2002 NFL Draft.

Foote has also played briefly for the Detroit Lions and Arizona Cardinals. He earned two Super Bowl rings with the Steelers in Super Bowl XL and Super Bowl XLIII.

College career

Foote played college football at the University of Michigan where he started 28-of-48 games recording 212 tackles (145 solo) and 11 sacks for minus-91 yards and 53 stops for losses of 155 yards. He ranked fourth in school history in stops behind the line of scrimmage.

Foote was an All-Big Ten Conference first-team choice by the league's coaches as a junior in 2000, earned second-team honors from the media, he played in every game during his freshman and sophomore season. He majored in physical education in the division of kinesiology.

As a senior in 2001, Foote as a first-team All-American selection by Football News and a second-team selection by The Sporting News as a senior and was a consensus All-Big Ten Conference first-team honoree and Defensive Player of the Year, he received the 2001 Roger Zatkoff Award, given to the team's top linebacker.

On October 27, playing for the 2001 Wolverines against Iowa, Foote set a school record with 7 tackles for a loss. The record stood until November 4, 2017 when Khaleke Hudson posted 8 against Minnesota in the Little Brown Jug rivalry game.

Professional career

Pittsburgh Steelers
Foote was selected by the Pittsburgh Steelers in the fourth round (128th overall) in the 2002 NFL Draft. In his rookie year, he played in 14 games recording 20 tackles. The following year, saw him play more of a role on special teams but he finished the season with six tackles. In 2004, Foote had a very solid year for the Steelers registering 69 tackles, three sacks and his first career interception. He had a breakout year in 2005. He started all 16 regular season games for the Steelers, recording 102 tackles and three quarterback sacks. Foote also had a key interception of Denver Broncos quarterback Jake Plummer during the 2005 AFC Championship Game. The Broncos, trailing in the game, returned a Steelers kick to midfield which threatened to shift the momentum away from the Steelers. However, on the next play from scrimmage, Foote intercepted Plummer's pass and effectively ended the Broncos rally. Foote and the Steelers won Super Bowl XL two weeks later. The 2006 season was another good one for Foote as he finished with 90 tackles, a career-high four sacks and one interception. In the 2007 season, he made 81 tackles, three sacks and one interception.

Foote was released by Pittsburgh on May 4, 2009, ending a seven-year career with the Steelers that included two Super Bowl titles. Foote had requested the release due to his diminishing playing time with the team after they drafted Lawrence Timmons in 2007.

Detroit Lions
Foote signed a one-year deal with his hometown Detroit Lions on May 6, 2009. He wore number 55, since the number 50, the number he wore in Pittsburgh, was worn by linebacker Ernie Sims.

Pittsburgh Steelers (Second stint)
On March 15, 2010, Foote signed a 3-year, $9.3 million contract to return to the Pittsburgh Steelers.
On March 12, 2013, Foote signed another 3-year contract to remain with the Steelers.

On March 5, 2014, Foote was released by the Steelers.

Arizona Cardinals

On May 6, 2014, Foote signed with the Arizona Cardinals. The team released him as a procedural move so he could begin his duties as assistant linebackers coach and he officially retired from football prior to the 2015 NFL regular season.

Coaching career

Arizona Cardinals
On February 19, 2015, Foote was hired as assistant linebackers coach by the Arizona Cardinals. He was promoted to linebackers coach in 2016.

Tampa Bay Buccaneers
On January 12, 2019, Foote agreed to terms with the Tampa Bay Buccaneers to become their outside linebackers coach, rejoining the staff of Bruce Arians. Foote earned his first Super Bowl title as a coach and third Super Bowl title overall when the Buccaneers won Super Bowl LV. Following the 2021 season, Foote was to be shifting roles to coaching the inside linebackers, but following Arians' resignation and the promotion of defensive coordinator Todd Bowles to head coach, Foote was named co-defensive coordinator of the Buccaneers, along with Kacy Rodgers.

Personal life
In March 2008, Foote paid for the funeral of Mark Brown-Williams, a ten-year-old child from Detroit, Michigan, who had drowned after falling through the ice on a tributary of the Rouge River in February. Foote had no pre-existing personal connection to the family, but he was touched after hearing of the tragedy, as he has a son of nearly that age himself and had played on the same frozen river when he was a child.

On June 28, 2008, Foote married Jonelle Massop. The couple have four children together; Jalyn, Tripp, Tramm and Mason.  Foote also has a son, Trey, from a previous relationship. His mother's name is Leslie Matthews; he has two sisters, Jennifer and Ciara Matthews.

References

External links
 Tampa Bay Buccaneers profile
Pittsburgh Steelers profile
Detroit Lions profile
Arizona Cardinals profile

1980 births
Living people
African-American coaches of American football
African-American players of American football
American football linebackers
Arizona Cardinals coaches
Arizona Cardinals players
Detroit Lions players
Michigan Wolverines football players
National Football League defensive coordinators
Pershing High School alumni
Pittsburgh Steelers players
Players of American football from Detroit
Tampa Bay Buccaneers coaches
21st-century African-American sportspeople
20th-century African-American people